Généreux was a French  74-gun ship of the line. After capture she completed her career as part of the Royal Navy as HMS Généreux.

History
She was launched in 1785 at Rochefort.

Shortly after the battle of the Nile, on 18 August 1798, she fell in with a smaller British ship of the line,  of 50 guns.  After a long battle, the Généreux captured the Leander, with the Leander suffering 35 killed and 57 wounded and the Généreux suffered around 100 killed and 180 wounded.

In March 1799, Généreux escorted a convoy to Corfu, which was being besieged by a joint Russo-Ottoman fleet. En route, her captain, Lejoille, decided to bombard Brindisi. He was killed in the ensuing exchange of fire, and lieutenant Claude Touffet took over. The city fell on 3 March after a two-hour battle.

On 6 February 1800, Généreux, under Captain Renaudin, departed from Toulon leading a squadron comprising the frigate Badine, the corvettes Sans Pareille and Fauvette, and the fluyt Ville de Marseille, under Rear-Admiral Jean-Baptiste Perrée. In the morning of 18 February, an English fleet chased the French squadron off Lampedusa island. In the ensuing Battle of the Malta Convoy, Perrée was killed, and Généreux covered the squadron, allowing Badine,  Sans Pareille and Fauvette to escape, before striking her colours.
Her battle ensign, a 16 m by 8.3 m tricolour, was given to the city of Norwich by Berry and Nelson. The flag has been preserved; its size and completeness marking it as a special artefact of the period.

She became HMS Généreux and she was in Minorca in 1801 when she press-ganged a crew from the Walmesley. She engaged Spanish ships and she was intended to go to Egypt. Storm damage prevented this so she patrolled off what is now Libya. After taking part in an unsuccessful attack on the French island of Elba, she set sail from Minorca for Spithead after peace was declared. She arrived at Spithead on 27 July 1802. She was finally broken up in 1816.

See also
 List of ships of the line of France

References

 

Ships of the line of the French Navy
Ships of the line of the Royal Navy
Téméraire-class ships of the line
1785 ships
Ships built in France